is a former Japanese football player and manager.

Playing career
Kimura was born in Aichi Prefecture on July 12, 1961. He played for Nissan Motors from 1985 to 1991.

Coaching career
After retirement, Kimura became a coach at Nissan Motors (later Yokohama F. Marinos) in 1991. In July 2008, he became a manager and managed until 2009. In 2012, he became a manager for Laos national team.

Managerial statistics

References

External links

1961 births
Living people
Waseda University alumni
Association football people from Aichi Prefecture
Japanese footballers
Japan Soccer League players
Yokohama F. Marinos players
Japanese football managers
J1 League managers
Yokohama F. Marinos managers
Laos national football team managers
Association football forwards
Expatriate football managers in Laos
Japanese expatriate football managers
Japanese expatriate sportspeople in Laos